Darcy S. Pattison (born June 28, 1954) is an American writer of fiction and nonfiction children’s literature, a blogger, writing teacher and indie publisher.   Her books have been translated into nine languages. Although she is best known for her work in children’s literature, she is also a writing teacher traveling across the nation presenting her Novel Revision Retreat. She has been featured as a writer and writing teacher in prestigious publications such as Writing Young Adult Fiction For Dummies, and 2012 Writer's Market. Pattison is also an independent publisher of ebooks for adults in the educational market.

She is the 2007 recipient of the Arkansas Governor’s Art Award for Individual Artist, and a member of the Authors Guild.

Personal life
Darcy Pattison is married and has four children.  Her hobby is quilting.  She is a member of International Quilters Association, American Quilters Society, Author’s Guild, Arkansas Quilter’s Guild.  Exhibitions: Arkansas Art Center, Regional Craft Biennial, two times (quilts).  Darcy's quilts have been shown nationally and her quilt, "Houses and Stars" is the cover quilt for the September, 1991 Quilting Today magazine. Twice her quilts hung in the seven-state, Regional Craft Biennial at the Arkansas Art Center and her award-winning quilt was in the Great Arkansas Quilt Show 2002; her daughter’s wedding quilt hung in the Great Arkansas Quilt Show II, 2007-8.

Education
University of Arkansas, Fayetteville, B.A.; Kansas State University, M.A.

Works

Young Adult/Teen Fiction
The Blue Planets World Series (2017)
Envoys, prequel
Sleepers, Book 1
Sirens, Book 2
Pilgrims, Book 3

Fiction Novels for children
Liberty (Mims House, 2016)
The Aliens, Inc. Series
Kell, the Alien. Aliens, Inc. Series, Book 1. Illustrated by Rich Davis. (Mims House, 2014) Publishers Weekly review
Kell and the Horse Apple Parade. Aliens, Inc. Series, Book 2. Illustrated by Rich Davis. (Mims House, 2014)
Kell and the Giants. Aliens, Inc. Series, Book 3. Illustrated by Rich Davis. (Mims House, 2014)
Kell and the Detectives. Aliens, Inc. Series, Book 4. Illustrated by Rich Davis. (Mims House, 2015) School Library Journal review
Longing for Normal (Mims House, 2015) Booklist Online Review 
The Girl, the Gypsy and the Gargoyle (Mims House, 2014)
Saucy and Bubba: A Hansel and Gretel Tale (Mims House, 2014).
Vagabonds (Mims House, 2014)
 The Wayfinder (Greenwillow Books, 2000), a middle-grade fantasy novel. Winchal Eldras goes on a quest for healing both for himself and for his land. Reviewed in SLJ, Booklist, BCCB, Horn Book, VOYA and Locus. Translated into Spanish, El buscador de camino. State award reading lists:

Fiction Picture Books for Children
The Read and Write Series
I Want a Dog: My Opinion Essay, Book 1 (Mims House, 2015)
I Want a Cat: My Opinion Essay, Book 2 (Mims House, 2015)
My Crazy Dog: My Narrative Essay, Book 3 (Mims House, 2016)
My Dirty Dog: My Informative Essay, Book 3 (Mims House, 2018)
"Rowdy, the Pirate Who Could Not Sleep" (Mims House, 2016)
11 Ways to Ruin a Photograph: Winner of “The Help” Children’s Story Contest. (Mims House, 2011) A girl decides it is not a family photo album while Dad is gone soldiering.
The Scary Slopes, (My First Graphic Novel series, Stone Arch Books, Jan., 2011 ). Snowboarding fun.
19 Girls and Me, (Philomel, 2006), illustrated by Steven Salerno, about friendship in a kindergarten class. Translated into Chinese (Commonwealth Magazine Co./Taiwan), Arabic (Dar El Shorouk/Egypt) and German. Reviewed in Kirkus, Publishers Weekly, the School Library Journal, Childhood Education. Children’s Book of the Month Club selection.
Searching for Oliver K. Woodman (Harcourt, 2005), a picture book illustrated by Joe Cepeda. When Oliver is missing for sixty days, his friends send Imogene Poplar, P.I.–a wooden woman–to find him. Reviewed in Kirkus, PW, BCCB, SLJ, Booklist. 2007-8 Arkansas Diamond Award Reading list.
 The Journey of Oliver K. Woodman (Harcourt Inc., 2003), a picture book illustrated by Joe Cepeda . A wooden man travels across the United States to connect a family. Reviewed in PW, SLJ, BCCB, Booklist, and Horn Book. *Starred reviews in Kirkus and CCBC. Booklist review  Autumn 2003 Children’s Booksense 76. Child and Nick Jr. Family Magazine Best Books of the Year 2003. Irma S. and James H. Black Picture Book Award Honor Book. Nutmeg Media Children’s Picture Books on Video, June 2005; 2006 ALA Notable Video. 2008 Houghton Mifflin reading series. Paperback version, spring, 2009. The Journey of Oliver K. Woodman was adapted as a video by Nutmeg Media and was a 2006 ALA Notable Video (May, 2005).
The River Dragon, a picture book illustrated by Jean and Mou-sien Tseng,(Lothrop, Lee & Shepard 1991) Translated into Swedish, Danish & Norwegian. ABA Pick of the Lists 1991. Reviewed by PW, SLJ, Childhood Education, Instructor Magazine.

Non fiction for children
Nefertiti, the Spidernaut: The Jumping Spider Who Learned to Hunt in Space (Mims House, 2016)
Burn: Michael Faraday's Candle (Mims House, 2016) School Library Journal Review.
 Abayomi, the Brazilian Puma: The True Story of an Orphaned Cub (Mims House, 2014) 2015 NSTA Outstanding Science Trade Book.
 Kentucky Basketball: America’s Winningest Teams (Rosen Publishers, 2014).
 Wisdom, the Midway Albatross: Surviving the Japanese Tsunami and other Disasters for over 60 Years (Mims House, 2012). The oldest wild bird in the world survives the Japanese tsunami and other disasters. 2013 20th Annual Writer’s Digest Self-Published Awards, first place in Children’s Picture Book category. Starred Publishers Weekly Review. Interviewed by Laurie Thompson.
 Desert Baths (Sylvan Dell Publishers, 2012). 24-hours of baths by desert animals. It was named a 2013 Outstanding Science Trade Book by the NSTA and CBC Reviewed in Kirkus.
 Prairie Storms (Sylvan Dell Publishers, 2011). A year of storms for the prairie animals. Reviewed in Kirkus, BookLoons, and SLJ.

Non fiction for adults
Writing for the Common Core: Writing, Speaking and Listening Activities Aligned with the Common Core (Mims House, 2014)
 Start Your Novel: Six Winning Steps Toward a Compelling Opening Line, Scene and Chapter (Mims House, 2013).
 What is Common Core? (Mims House, 2013).
 Common Core ELA Activities: Month by Month Writing, Speaking and Listening Activities Aligned with the Common Core, (Mims House, 2012).
 Paper Lightning: Sparking Student Brainstorming for Effective Pre-writing (Prufrock Press, 2008). A teacher-resource book about pre-writing strategies.
 Novel Metamorphosis: Uncommon Ways to Revise (Mims House, 2008). A novel revision workbook.

Ebooks for adults
 How to Write a Children’s Picture Book (Mims House, 2010)
 The Book Trailer Manual (Mims House, 2010)

Speaker
Pattison has presented at the National Teachers of English national conference, the American Library Association national conference, the Society of Children’s Bookwriters and Illustrators national conferences and numerous local and regional conference. In 1999, she created the Novel Revision retreat and has taught it across the United States. She participated in the 2012 and 2013 Authors for Earth Day program.

References

External links
Personal website
Balkin Buddies, (June 2, 2012), author profile 
(June 2, 2012), Lyn Seippel, review of Prairie Storms
Darcy Pattison, The Studio, GirlScouts.org. Featured author for August, 2012
(June 2, 2012), “Interview with Author Darcy Pattison & Illustrator Joe Cepeda

1954 births
Living people
American women writers
21st-century American women